Derek Johnson may refer to:
Derek Johnson (athlete) (1933–2004), British track and field athlete
Derek Johnson (musician) (born 1987), American Christian musician
Derek Johnson (baseball) (born 1971), American baseball coach
Derek Wayne Johnson (born 1983), American film director, screenwriter, film producer and actor
Derek Acorah (Derek Johnson, born 1950), self-described spirit medium
Derek Johnson (politician), MLA in Manitoba

See also
Derrick Johnson (disambiguation)